Sodexo (formerly Sodexho Alliance) is a French food services and facilities management company headquartered in the Paris suburb of Issy-les-Moulineaux. It has 412,088 employees as of 2021, operates in 55 countries and serves 100 million customers on a daily basis. It is Europe’s second largest company of its type by both number of employees and revenue after Compass Group.

For fiscal year 2021 (ending August 2010) revenues reached €17.4 billion with an underlying operating profit of 578 million euro. Market capitalization was 11.5 billion euro as at October 26, 2021.

Sodexo serves many sectors, including private corporations, government agencies, schools from preschool through university (including seminaries and trade schools), hospitals and clinics, assisted-living facilities, military bases, and prisons.  As of 2016 subsidiary Sodexo Justice Services operated support services in 122 prisons in eight countries, including 42 in the Netherlands, 34 in France, and others in Belgium, Italy, Spain, and Chile, as well as directly running 5 prisons in the UK.

History
The company was launched in 1966 by Pierre Bellon (Chairman) in Marseille, France, initially serving company restaurants, schools and hospitals under the name Société d'Exploitation Hotelière. Today Sodexo is on the Fortune Global 500 list and the second largest employer among all French multi-national corporations.

Throughout the 1970s, the company expanded in France and internationally; first in Belgium, then Africa, and finally the Middle East. After an initial public offering on the Paris Bourse in 1983, the firm continued its expansion into North America, South America, Japan, South Africa and Russia.

In 1994, on October 31, Sodexo began operations in India. Currently Sodexo India has over 40,135 employees. The head office is situated in Goregaon, Mumbai.

In 1997, Société d'Exploitation Hotelière's holding company changed its name to Sodexho, and joined forces with Universal Ogden Services, the leading remote-site service provider in the U.S.

On January 11, 1995, Sodexo S.A. acquired food company Gardner Merchant Ltd. from Cinven and CVC Capital Partners.

In 1998, Sodexho merged with Marriott Management Services, at the time one of the largest food services companies in North America.  Included in the merger was a name change to Sodexho Marriott Services.  The merger helped the company become one of the largest food services providers in the United States. In June 2001, Sodexho acquired complete control of Sodexho Marriott Services.

In 2002, Sodexho was listed on the New York Stock Exchange, but the company withdrew its listing in 2007. As of 2017, the company is listed on Euronext Paris under the symbol SW and trades stocks over-the-counter under the symbols SDXOF and SDXAY.

In 2005, Michel Landel was appointed Chief Executive Officer, succeeding Pierre Bellon, who continues as Chairman of the Board of Directors.

In the summer of 2006, the company made headlines for concluding a deal with retired NBA Hall of Famer and entrepreneur, Magic Johnson and Magic Food Provisions, a subsidiary of Magic Johnson Enterprises. The initiative includes a marketing agreement and the formation of SodexhoMAGIC, LLC, a new joint venture that is 51 percent owned by Johnson.

In 2007, Sodexho launched its catering arm in United Kingdom schools, using the brand name "For you...".

In 2008, Sodexho changed its name to Sodexo, dropping the h in order to make the name easier to pronounce in many languages worldwide.

In August 2009, Sodexo acquired the in-home care services company, Comfort Keepers. Comfort Keepers provides non-medical, in-home care for adults and seniors. It is an international franchise system with locally owned and operated franchise offices, and is headquartered in Dayton, Ohio. The company was launched in 1998. Comfort Keepers franchises are located throughout the United States, Canada, Australia, France, Ireland, Portugal, Singapore, and the United Kingdom. As of June 2016, Comfort Keepers had 500 franchisees running 750 offices in the United States and internationally. Comfort Keepers was named by INC. Magazine as one of the fastest-growing franchise systems in the United States in 2007. In 2016, Comfort Keepers was ranked number seven by Forbes as a "Top Franchise to Buy" in the lowest investment category.

The DiversityInc Top 50 Companies for Diversity is the leading assessment of diversity management in the US economy and globally. In 2010, Sodexo ranked number one. According to the report, Sodexo "has led every other company in its ability to implement measure and assess strong internal diversity initiatives".

In 2010, Sodexo entered into two new partnerships: the first one with United Coffee, who will supply Sodexo with machines as well as fair-trade certified coffees; the other one with Numi, from which Sodexo has selected 100% organic teas.

In 2011, Sodexo entered an eight-year contract with the US government, by which the company committed itself to provide food services to 51 United States Marine Corps mess halls.

In January 2016, Lorna C. Donatone was appointed head of Sodexo's North American business operations and CEO of its school operations worldwide.

In 2018, shareholders meeting, Denis Machuel replaced Michel Landel as CEO.

On the death of Pierre Bellon in 2022, his daughter Sophie Bellon took over the roles of chairwoman of the board of directors and CEO.

Food services and facilities management

Sodexo offerings range from food service operations including staff restaurants, catering, executive dining, vending, and meal delivery, to integrated facilities management services that include both soft services (reception, concierge, cleaning, pantry, laundry, groundskeeping, waste management, vendor management, etc.) and hard services (HVAC systems, electrical systems including substations up to 220kV, energy efficiency & sustainability services, plumbing/water treatment plant/sewage treatment plant operation, annual equipment operation & maintenance contracts, project management, etc.).

Service vouchers and cards
One of the top-two companies worldwide in this sector, Sodexo provides companies and public authorities with meal passes, restaurant vouchers, mobility passes, leisure passes, book cards, and training vouchers. In China and the US, it operates a stored-value card system in cooperation with multiple restaurants. Freedompay is used to power some of these deployments.

Name change
The company changed its official name from Sodexho Alliance to simply Sodexo after a shareholder vote at the company's annual general meeting on 22 January 2008. The reason for removing the letter 'h' from Sodexho, cited in the group's 2007 annual report, is that "in certain languages an 'x' followed by an 'h' is difficult to pronounce". The company's corporate website also states that it draws emphasis away from the hotel services industry they were once associated with, as they now focus on many other directions. The Sod part of the name remains unchanged. The logo of the company was also changed, dropping the five stars to a single star. The bar of the letter 'x' is also now curved, like a smile, supposedly suggestive of the company's claimed desire to constantly seek and increase the satisfaction of their clients.

Controversy
In 2009, the Service Employees International Union (SEIU) launched a United States nationwide campaign against Sodexo with the stated objective of improving wage and job standards. In 2010, the SEIU recruited students at many U.S. colleges to support strikes and demonstrations in protest of Sodexo's alleged unfair labor practices including anti-union behavior and paying low wages. Although one series of strikes at the University of Pittsburgh led to the negotiation of higher wages and lower cost health insurance plans for the cafeteria workers, none of the Sodexo accounts targeted by the SEIU have unionized or requested an election vote. According to a statement from Sodexo, the SEIU engaged in a smear campaign in an effort to drive out rival labor unions that have traditionally operated in the foodservice industry as well as for general publicity.

Sodexo filed a lawsuit in March 2011 under the Racketeer Influenced and Corrupt Organizations Act accusing the SEIU of "engaging in illegal tactics in its effort to unionize workers". During the trial, it was revealed that the SEIU had written and distributed a manual to its staff detailing how "outside pressure can involve jeopardizing relationships between the employer and lenders, investors, stockholders, customers, clients, patients, tenants, politicians, or others on whom the employer depends for funds." Tactics recommended include references to blackmail, extortion, accusations of racism and sexism, and targeting the homes and neighborhoods of business leaders for demonstrations. Following the court discovery of this document, the SEIU agreed to terminate their public campaign focused on Sodexo and the charges against SEIU were dropped.

In May 2011, 27 University of Washington students were arrested during a sit-in at the university's administrative offices for protesting the university's concessions contract with Sodexo. Later that same month, another 13 students were arrested under similar circumstances.

In April 2012, a Sodexo regional manager disrupted a student protest at the State University of New York at New Paltz by tearing up protesters' signs. Students there had organized a protest to highlight what they saw as the company's unethical treatment of workers and its lack of response to issues of sustainability.

On 22 February 2013, all of the frozen beef products used by Sodexo in the UK were withdrawn following the discovery of horse DNA in a sample. The company supplies 2,300 institutions, including schools, senior citizen homes, prisons and branches of the armed forces within the UK.

In August 2013, Sodexo Justice Services was criticised in an official report for subjecting a female prisoner to "cruel, inhumane and degrading treatment", which "appears to amount to torture" at HMP Bronzefield in Ashford, Surrey, UK. The woman was kept segregated from other prisoners in an "unkempt and squalid" prison cell for more than five years.

In February 2019, Sodexo was criticized by the United Kingdom Ministry of Justice for failing to prevent repeated and systemic breaches of the human rights of inmates at the Sodexo-operated HMP Peterborough. This stemmed from a series of illegal strip-searches of prisoners at the jail in 2017, including one inmate who was menstruating and another who was transitioning from female to male. Justice Julian Knowles described the illegal procedures as "humiliating and embarrassing."

HMP Bronzefield in Surrey, operated by Sodexo Justice Services, were investigated by police after allowing a woman to give birth alone in her cell without any kind of medical support. The baby was found dead in the early hours of 27 September 2019.

In December 2019, a dispute between the UNITE HERE Local 11 union and the Sodexo operation at Loyola Marymount University threatened to derail a planned Democratic Party presidential candidate debate at the university. The union alleged mistreatment of food service workers.

Starting in October 2019, Sodexo employees (mainly cleaners, porters and caterers) at St Mary's Hospital, London,  organised by the UVW union, protested at unfair pay and terms on their contract with the hospital and were asking to be brought in-house as full NHS employees and to be paid the London Living Wage of £10.85/hour. After being told that this wasn't possible and after Sodexo pay packets missing payments, employees did several days of industrial action, resulting in one of the longest strikes in NHS history. This resulted in all their demands being satisfied, and as there were 4 other hospitals administered by the same trust, all of their 1,200 Sodexo employees were brought in-house and became full NHS employees in January 2020. The employees were almost entirely black, latino and Asian people and/or migrants. The industrial action was co-ordinated by Loreta Younsi, a Lithuanian migrant, who had worked as a cleaner at the hospital for 12 years. A documentary called "Fight for your rights: the trade union for outsourced workers" was created afterwards and is on YouTube.

See also

References

Notes
  These numbers were calculated based upon the revenues by region in four main revenue categories (On-site Services, Business & Administrations, Education, Healthcare & Seniors).

External links

 
 Comfort Keepers

1966 establishments in France
Catering and food service companies of France
Companies based in Île-de-France
Companies listed on Euronext Paris
Conglomerate companies of France
Food and drink companies established in 1966
Food and drink companies of France
Foodservice companies
Hauts-de-Seine
Multinational companies headquartered in France
Private providers of NHS services
Property management companies
Service companies of France